Ceira may refer to:

 Ceira (Coimbra), a civil parish in Portugal
 Ceira River, a river in Portugal
 Ceira longipennis, a moth in the family Notodontidae
 Cacyparis ceira, a moth in the genus Cacyparis

See also 
 Ceiràs, a commune in southern France
 Keira (disambiguation)
 Caira (disambiguation)
 Ciera (disambiguation)
 Ciara (given name)